Daisy Voisin (23 September 1924 – 7 August 1991) was a Parang singer and composer.

Life and career
Voisin was born and grew up in Carapal Erin, Trinidad and Tobago. She began her singing career in the Village Council and other local groups. A deeply religious person, she received the message to spread the gospel of Parang in a church in Siparia in 1973. Not long after she was launched into the spotlight at a "Best Village" competition in 1971. She did her best to live up to that calling.

Hailed as the undisputed "Queen of Parang" for her vocal prowess and the many triumphs and popularity of the band she led, the La Divina Pastora Serenaders, Daisy Voisin left an indelible mark on the local Parang scene in Trinidad and Tobago. Armed with her sweet, powerful voice and a bouquet of flowers in hand, she ruled Parang music in for countless years. Her signature songs "Hurray Hurrah" and "Alegría, Alegría" becoming Christmas classics, sung with her characteristic musical trill "Aiyee, Aiyee".

Her live performances were described as "explosive, vivacious and tempestuous". Voisin and her group became cultural ambassadors for Trinidad and Tobago taking the music to places in the Caribbean, Isla de Margarita, Venezuela, and North America.

In the later days of her life, Voisin's performances were few, hampered by ill-health, but the quality of her voice was still evident.

Memorable recordings
 Hurray Hurrah
 Alegría, Alegría

Selected compositions
 Sereno, Sereno
 Daisy Voisin
 Daisy, Daisy, Daisy
 El Nacimiento de la Verdad
 Alegría, Alegría

External links
What is Parang?
https://web.archive.org/web/20050323090255/http://www.silvertorch.com/arts/parang.htm
Daisy Voisin Tribute
https://web.archive.org/web/20071014005222/http://www.parang.itgo.com/

1924 births
1991 deaths
20th-century Trinidad and Tobago women singers
20th-century Trinidad and Tobago singers
People from Siparia region